Ayşe Hümaşah Sultan  ("The living one" or "womanly" and "Şah's Phoenix", 1541 – 1598) was an Ottoman princess, the only daughter of Mihrimah Sultan and Rüstem Pasha (Grand Vizier 1544–53, 1555–61). She had a younger brother, Sultanzade Osman Bey. She was granddaughter of Sultan Suleiman the Magnificent (1520–1566) and his favorite consort and legal wife, Hurrem Sultan, and their first grandchild.

Life

Early life
Ayşe Hümaşah Sultan was born 1541 in Istanbul. Her father was Rüstem Pasha,  a devshirme from Croatia, and her mother was Mihrimah Sultan, daughter of Sultan Suleiman the Magnificent and Hurrem Sultan. She was the first child of her parents, and the first granddaughter of her maternal grandparents. Later, she had a younger brother, Sultanzade Osman Bey. Like her cousin Hümaşah Sultan, she was reportedly beloved by their grandfather. A sign of her grandfather's favor towards her can be seen from her title: Ayşe Hümaşah was in fact titled Sultan as the daughters of the male members of the dynasty, rather than with the title, inferior, of Hanımsultan as the daughter of the female members. Consequently, her sons and daughters, who as great-grandchildren in the female line of a Sultan should have neither titles nor be considered members of the imperial family, were instead entitled to the titles of Sultanzade for males and Hanımsultan for females, as was rule for the children of a Sultana. Ayşe Hümaşah, her mother, and her cousin would all imitate the communication style ushered in by her grandmother Hurrem, whose letters to the Sultan are known for their colourfulness, charm, and smoothness.

First marriage
Ayşe Hümaşah married two times. Her first husband was the future Grand vizier, Şemsi Ahmet Pasha. The two together had ten children including, Sultanzade Abdurrahman Bey, Sultanzade Mehmed Bey, Sultanzade Şehid Mustafa Pasha, Sultanzade Osman Bey, and Saliha Sultan. Her mother used to send two thousand ducats to the couple every week. Ahmet Pasha became grand vizier in 1579, and died in 1580.

Second marriage
After Ahmet's death, Ayşe Hümaşah married Feridun Ahmed Bey, who had served twice as the head scribe of the imperial chancery. The marriage took place on 7 April 1582. Kizlar Agha Mehmed Agha, served as her agent, while Miralem Mahmud Agha served as Feridun Pasha's agent. The marriage was performed by Sheikh-ul-Islam Çivizade Hacı Mehmet Efendi. Her dowry was thirty five thousand gold coins. The marriage, however, lasted only eleven months because the pasha died on 16 March 1583.

Political affairs
After her mother's death in 1578, the Ragusans turned to her, with a petition to act in their favour and support them in a manner her mother did, whose death they mourned deeply. In fact, all of this they reported to Behram Kethüda, who by sultan's order was to attend to Ayşe Hümaşah after Mihrimah's death. She and her husband Şemsi Pasha shared a disposition towards the Ragusans. When her son Mehmed Bey was installed as sancakbey of Herzegovina on 1592, she soon wrote him a letter of recommendation for 
the Ragusans. In 1591, she proposed to pay the expenses of one hundred galleys for six months, if her son-in-law Çiğalazade Sinan Pasha was made Kapudan Pasha. According to the French ambassador Jacques de Germigny, Ayşe Hümaşah formed a political faction with Safiye Sultan to oppose Nurbanu Sultan and her allies.

Last years
In 1595, Ayşe Hümaşah went for a pilgrimage. In 1598, she commissioned a fountain in Üsküdar. When she died, she was buried in the complex of Şeyh ‘Azîz Mahmûd Hüdâyî Efendi, Üsküdar.

Issue 
Ayşe Hümaşah had ten children by her first husband; five sons and five daughters:

Sons
 Sultanzade Abdurrahman Bey, (died 1596/1597), buried in Mihrimah Sultan Mosque), married Ayşe Hanım, a daughter of Cığalazade Yusuf Sinan Pasha, and had a son, Semiz Mehmed Pasha;
 Sultanzade Mehmed Bey (died 1593), sanjak-bey of Herzegovina; 
 Sultanzade Şehid Mustafa Pasha (died 1593), sanjak-bey of Klis;
 Sultanzade Osman Bey (died 1590–91, buried in Mihrimah Sultan Mosque), sanjak-bey of Şebinkarahisar;
Sultanzade Mahmud Pasha († 1602 buried in the Mihrimah Sultan Mosque) Sanjak-bey of Kastamonu and Nakhchivan sanjak-bey of Şebinkarahisar;.

Daughters
 Saliha Hanımsultan (1561–1580) married in October 1576 to Cığalazade Yusuf Sinan Pasha. Mihrimah Sultan spent 70.000 gold coins for her wedding. She had a son, Sultanzade Mahmud Pasha (who in 1612 married Hatice Sultan, daughter of Sultan Mehmed III) and a daughter. 
Safiye Hanımsultan, married in March 1581 to Cığalazade Yusuf Sinan Pasha after her sister's death in 1580. She had two sons and a daughter. 
Hatice Hanımsultan, married Kapıcıbaşı Mahmud Bey in December 1584
Ayşe Hanımsultan. Probably she died in infancy. 
Fülane Hanımsultan, married in March 1596 to Yemenli Hasan Pasha.

In popular culture
 In the 2011–2014 TV series Muhteşem Yüzyıl, Ayşe Hümaşah Sultan is portrayed by Kayra Aleyna Zabcı.

References

1541 births
Royalty from Istanbul
16th-century Ottoman princesses